Marina's Destiny is a 1953 Soviet drama film directed by Viktor Ivchenko. It was entered into the 1954 Cannes Film Festival.

Plot 
The film takes place in Ukraine, in the village of Lebedinki. Marina Vlasenko awaits the return of her husband, Terence Vlasenko, who left to study at the Kiev Institute of Agriculture. But when he returns home, Marina is happy for long. The husband immediately files for her divorce, because she had no education and he is an educated man. Marina remains alone, a daughter, and delves into the study, where she has great success in her work. As a result, she is awarded the title Hero of Socialist Labor.

Cast
Yekaterina Litvinenko
Nikolai Gritsenko
Tatyana Konyukhova
Les Serdyuk
Mikhail Kuznetsov
Boris Andreyev
Nonna Koperzhinskaya 
Rimma Manukovskaya
Leonid Bykov
Roza Makagonova  
Mikhail Zadneprovsky  
Olesya Ivanova
M. Belousov
Yury Timoshenko 
Klavdiya Khabarova  
 Yevgeny Matveyev

References

External links

1953 films
1953 drama films
Soviet drama films
1950s Russian-language films
Films directed by Viktor Ivchenko